Herbert Rodríguez (born 15 December 1967) is a Salvadoran athlete. He competed in the men's discus throw at the 1992 Summer Olympics.

References

1967 births
Living people
Athletes (track and field) at the 1992 Summer Olympics
Salvadoran male discus throwers
Olympic athletes of El Salvador
Place of birth missing (living people)
Central American Games gold medalists for El Salvador
Central American Games medalists in athletics